WTUK (105.1 FM) is a radio station  broadcasting a country music format and is licensed to broadcast from Harlan, Kentucky, in the United States.  The station is owned by Eastern Broadcasting Company.

The station broadcasts on 105.1 MHz. Its 530-watt signal covers Harlan County, Kentucky, and much of southeastern Kentucky. The FM station broadcasts 24 hours with a country music format, with daily news, coverage of local high school sports, and University of Kentucky football and basketball games on the UK Sports Network, as well as newscasts from the Kentucky News Network of Louisville.

References

External links

TUK
Harlan County, Kentucky
TUK
1990 establishments in Kentucky
Radio stations established in 1990